Vasay Chaudhry (Punjabi, ; born on 12 November 1981) is a Pakistani screenwriter, actor, director, producer, host, and comedian. He is best known for writing sitcoms and comedy-dramas for Pakistani televisions. He is also known for writing films. He wrote Main Hoon Shahid Afridi and Jawani Phir Nahi Ani. While Mai Hoon Shahid Afridi was an average success, Jawani phir Nahe ani went on to become the highest grossing film of Pakistan cinema and broke all the previous Box office  records while earning more than 490 million at the box office. He also wrote Jawani Phir Nahi Ani 2, which was released on 2018 Eid al-Adha and broke the all time biggest box office grosses record.It also went on to become the First Pakistani film to make 700 Million rupees worldwide. Chaudhry is also known for hosting the comedy show, Mazaaq Raat, on Dunya News since 2015. His name is sometimes misspelled as Wasay, Wassay, Wesay or Vassay in print and electronic media.

Biography
Chaudhry was born on 12 November 1981 and lives in Lahore.

He belongs to a family involved in the entertainment industry for generations, as his paternal grandfather worked in the world of movies before Partition, establishing Lahore’s famed Ratan Cinema in 1945, cinema which would later be owned by Chaudhry’s father. Because of Partition, the grandfather, Chaudhary Eid Muhammad, had to move to  Lahore from Ambala, where he ran cinemas as he did in Dehradun as well while he used to do bookings of the shows as far as Delhi.

He completed his A-levels studies from Lahore College of Arts and Sciences. Chaudhry enrolled himself at Government College University (Lahore) for a bachelor's degree but ended up graduating from University of Punjab, Lahore. Later, he began an MBA at Lahore School of Economics but dropped the course after the first semester. He later earned an MMA (Master's in Multimedia Arts) degree at National College of Arts.

He married Mahera Shah in 2008 and the couple have three daughters together.

Career

Chaudhry started his career in 1998 when he did a theatre play called Desperado. He recalls, "I had just a 45-second role in it! So I started off with a role – that calling it a cameo would be a disgrace! I began to pursue theatre seriously when I went to LACAS for my A-levels where I met Zain Ahmed (actress/director Samina Ahmad's son) and acted and assisted him on his play, Blood wedding". Afterwards, he went on to become head of the Dramatics Club in LACAS and directed an old Urdu play called Bari Dair Meherban Aatay Aatay for the Rafi Peer Theatre International Theatre Festival in 1999.

Chaudhry's first writing venture for television was a sitcom called Jutt and Bond in 2001, starring Fawad Khan in lead role along with Ahmad Ali Butt and Farah Tufail. It was television adaptation of his theatre play of the same name performed in 2000. Chaudhry approached Younis Butt to write the series; when he refused, Chaudhry wrote the show himself. He recollected the memories of Jutt and Bond while speaking to a newspaper "So, then I sat down to make the decision and thought about all the terrible dramas I have seen in my life. I thought about how bad could my writing really is, decided to give it a shot and wrote Jutt and Bond."

In 2010, after establishing himself in 25-minute sitcom business, he wrote his first long TV serial Dolly ki Ayegi Baraat, which turned out to be a huge commercial and critical hit. He continued writing long TV serials after success of Dolly. Chaudhry in an interview stated that he has started enjoying writing for film and TV more than sitcoms.
Chaudhry's most famous TV plays as a writer include Timmy G, Dolly Ki Ayegi Baraat, Takkay Ki Ayegi Baraat, Inspector Khojee, Kash Tu Mera Baap Na Hota, Yeh Shaadi Nahi Ho Sakti, telefilm Armaan and Jackson Heights (drama). He terms his Eid Special play Kash Tu Mera Baap Na Hota which aired on Geo TV, 2011, as one of his personal favourite work along with Inspector Khojee and Jackson Heights. In cinematic work, he debuted with the script and screenplay writing for Main Hoon Shahid Afridi; it was declared a commercial hit of Pakistani cinema, 2013, and garnered accolades from critics and audience alike.

Chaudhry has been seen in TV commercials from time to time, prominent ones include MCB ad and Zong. Chaudhry wrote in the Herald (Pakistan) as a film reviewer and critic for a brief period, during 2002–03. Since then he has occasionally contributed towards writing on Pakistani media and cinema in Pakistan's leading newspapers like Pakistan Today, The Express Tribune and The News.

Mantra
Chaudhry in one interview explained the reason for writing as "only to bring the people's attention to the various character types that exist amidst us. It is important to be a responsible role model but for most people, it is easier to pick ideas off the internet and ape them."

Chaudhry believes in self-censorship but insists "My target has always been to entertain people; I am not into "artistic stuff" as far as my work is concerned, at least not now. Even when I was doing theatre, I wasn't into it. I suppose it's because I am influenced by entertainment films of the 80s and 90s". He regards Anwar Maqsood and Mushtaq Ahmad Yusufi as his gurus in comedy writing and laments the lack of fresh ideas and wit in majority of current comedies. Being a strong believer in originality he was quoted saying "It's mostly foreign concepts that we are picking up and then trying to localize and obviously failing. We need to learn to improvise rather than copy ideas."

Reception
Chaudhry has been praised in the Pakistani press as a writer uniquely in touch and comfortable with Punjabi culture. He is a firm believer of "self censorship" and calls himself old school when it comes to the views regarding a writer's moral responsibility towards his audiences. He credits this to his training in a pre-cable TV world and asserts that he "refrains from [writing] obnoxious jokes."

Television

Writing
Chaudhry has contributed as a writer in various TV shows:

Acting

Hosting

Direction

Production

Guest appearances
2011: The Morning Show with Huma Amir Shah as himself
2014: Mehman Qadardan as himself
2014: Cocktail Dawn News as himself
2014: Mazaaq Raat as himself
2015: Tonite with HSY as himself
2015: Good Morning Pakistan (Team Jawani Phir Nahi Ani-Eid Special) as himself
2015: Jeeto Pakistan (Team Jawani Phir Nahi Ani Special) as himself
2016: Salam Zindagi with Faysal Qureshi as himself
2016: Star Iftar with Sarmad Khoosat as himself
2020:  Say it all with iffat omer

Filmography

Theater

Awards and nominations

References

External links
 

Living people
1981 births
Government College University, Lahore alumni
Male actors from Lahore
National College of Arts alumni
Pakistani dramatists and playwrights
Pakistani male comedians
Punjabi people
University of the Punjab alumni